Jules Gaucher (13 September 1905 – 13 March 1954) was a French Army officer noted for his command of Foreign Legion troops in Indochina. Described as a "burly, hard-drinking veteran of years of jungle fighting, with a nose like an axe-blade and a mouth like its cut", Gaucher was a popular commander among the Legion, known as 'the Old Man' to his troops. He was killed at the Battle of Dien Bien Phu in 1954.

Early life
Gaucher graduated from the French military academy at Saint-Cyr in 1929 and was commissioned as a Sous-lieutenant (2nd Lieutenant). He was posted to French Algeria and served as an officer with the Régiment de Tirailleurs Algériens from 1929 to 1931. He transferred to the Foreign Legion in 1931 and served in North Africa with the 1st Foreign Legion Regiment (1e REI) and the 3rd Foreign Legion Regiment (3e REI). In 1938 he was promoted to Capitaine (Captain) and transferred to 5th Foreign Infantry Regiment (5° REI) in Tonkin. When open conflict erupted between the occupying Japanese and French forces in March 1945, Gaucher led his battalion out of Hanoi and marched to Dien Bien Phu, where he received an encouraging radio message from General Charles De Gaulle. Pursued by the Japanese, he then led his soldiers into China. He was promoted to Chef de bataillon (Major) that same year and returned to the Foreign Legion depot at Sidi Bel Abbes where he joined 13e Démi-Brigade de la Légion Étrangère (13e DBLE).

Indochina 1950–54

Gaucher was appointed to command of 3rd battalion of 13th demi-brigade (III/13e DBLE) in 1949 and returned to Indochina at the head of his battalion in 1950 as part of the French Far East Expeditionary Corps to participate in the First Indochina War. Under his command, III/13e DBLE served throughout Indochina – notably in the Delta (1951) and at the Battle of Hòa Bình (1951–52). In 1951 he was promoted to Lieutenant-colonel and asked to remain in Indochina with 13e DBLE instead of accepting command elsewhere. He served as second-in-command (executive officer) of 13e DBLE from 1951 to 1953, until in 1953 he was appointed as commander of 13e DBLE. He had the reputation of a tough and hard-drinking soldier.

Dien Bien Phu 1953–54

Gaucher was appointed to command of Groupe Mobile 9 during the Battle of Dien Bien Phu. The group (equivalent to a regimental combat team) comprised three infantry battalions, the I/13e DBLE (Demi-brigade de Légion étrangère, Foreign Legion half-brigade), III/13e DBLE, and III/3e RTA (Régiment de tirailleurs algériens, Algerian sharpshooters regiment), and one artillery battery (the III/10e RAC). Stationed at the collection of strong points known as Béatrice to the northeast of the main base, Gaucher showed visitors that his men had cleared brambles and thickets to establish clear fields of fire and he expressed confidence in the formidable French defenses. By the beginning of March, Gaucher's men at Béatrice were taking casualties while on patrol, losing six officers in addition to the enlisted men.

On March 13, 1954, Gaucher made rounds among his men, pointing out weaknesses in defensive works and ordering final preparations for the attack he was confident would come that night. He told his men that Béatrice, overlooking the road and exposed on the northeastern edge of the French base, was "the little goat that the tiger eats for breakfast."

During the attack that indeed came that night, Gaucher's command post was hit by artillery fire. Suffering from serious wounds – the loss of both arms, severe injuries to both legs, and an open chest wound – he died at the hospital. His command of the base's central sub-sector was passed on to Lieutenant-colonel Pierre Langlais.

Notes

References
 Fall, Bernard B. 1966 (2002). Hell in a Very Small Place: The Siege of Dien Bien Phu. Da Capo Press. 
 Morgan, Ted. Valley of Death: The Tragedy at Dien Bien Phu That Led America into the Vietnam War, Random House. 
 Windrow, Martin. 2004. The Last Valley. Da Capo Press.

External links
 Biography (in Italian)

1905 births
1954 deaths
People from Bourges
Officers of the French Foreign Legion
French military leaders
French military personnel killed in the First Indochina War
French military personnel of the First Indochina War